Italian fascism, also known as classical fascism or simply fascism, is the original fascist ideology as developed in Italy by Giovanni Gentile and Benito Mussolini. The ideology is associated with a series of two political parties led by Benito Mussolini: the National Fascist Party (PNF), which ruled the Kingdom of Italy from 1922 until 1943, and the Republican Fascist Party (PFR) that ruled the Italian Social Republic from 1943 to 1945. Italian fascism is also associated with the post-war Italian Social Movement (MSI) and subsequent Italian neo-fascist movements.

Italian fascism was rooted in Ultranationalism, Italian nationalism, national syndicalism, revolutionary nationalism, and the desire to restore and expand Italian territories, which Italian Fascists deemed necessary for a nation to assert its superiority and strength and to avoid succumbing to decay. Italian Fascists also claimed that modern Italy was the heir to ancient Rome and its legacy, and historically supported the creation of an imperial Italy to provide spazio vitale ("living space") for colonization by Italian settlers and to establish control over the Mediterranean Sea.

Italian fascism promoted a corporatist economic system, whereby employer and employee syndicates are linked together in associations to collectively represent the nation's economic producers and work alongside the state to set national economic policy. This economic system intended to resolve class conflict through collaboration between the classes.

Italian fascism opposed liberalism, especially classical liberalism, which fascist leaders denounced as "the debacle of individualism". Fascism was opposed to socialism because of the latter's frequent opposition to nationalism, but it was also opposed to the reactionary conservatism developed by Joseph de Maistre. It believed the success of Italian nationalism required respect for tradition and a clear sense of a shared past among the Italian people, alongside a commitment to a modernised Italy.

Originally, many Italian fascists were opposed to Nazism, as fascism in Italy did not espouse Nordicism nor, initially, the antisemitism inherent in Nazi ideology; however, many fascists, in particular Mussolini himself, held racist ideas (specifically anti-Slavism) that were enshrined into law as official policy over the course of fascist rule. As fascist Italy and Nazi Germany grew politically closer in the latter half of the 1930s, Italian laws and policies became explicitly antisemitic due to pressure from Nazi Germany (even though antisemitic laws were not commonly enforced in Italy), including the passage of the Italian racial laws. When the fascists were in power, they also persecuted some linguistic minorities in Italy. In addition, the Greeks in Dodecanese and Northern Epirus, which were then under Italian occupation and influence, were persecuted.

Principal beliefs

Nationalism 

Italian fascism is based upon Italian nationalism and in particular seeks to complete what it considers as the incomplete project of Risorgimento by incorporating Italia Irredenta (unredeemed Italy) into the state of Italy. The National Fascist Party (PNF) founded in 1921 declared that the party was to serve as "a revolutionary militia placed at the service of the nation. It follows a policy based on three principles: order, discipline, hierarchy".

It identifies modern Italy as the heir to the Roman Empire and Italy during the Renaissance and promotes the cultural identity of Romanitas (Roman-ness). Italian fascism historically sought to forge a strong Italian Empire as a Third Rome, identifying ancient Rome as the First Rome and Renaissance-era Italy as the Second Rome. Italian fascism has emulated ancient Rome and Mussolini in particular emulated ancient Roman leaders, such as Julius Caesar as a model for the fascists' rise to power and Augustus as a model for empire-building. Italian fascism has directly promoted imperialism, such as within the Doctrine of Fascism (1932), ghostwritten by Giovanni Gentile on behalf of Mussolini:

Irredentism and expansionism 

Fascism emphasized the need for the restoration of the Mazzinian Risorgimento tradition that followed the unification of Italy, that the fascists claimed had been left incomplete and abandoned in the Giolittian-era Italy. Fascism sought the incorporation of claimed "unredeemed" territories into Italy.

To the east of Italy, the fascists claimed that Dalmatia was a land of Italian culture whose Italians, including those of Italianized South Slavic descent, had been driven out of Dalmatia and into exile in Italy, and supported the return of Italians of Dalmatian heritage. Mussolini identified Dalmatia as having strong Italian cultural roots for centuries via the Roman Empire and the Republic of Venice. The fascists especially focused their claims based on the Venetian cultural heritage of Dalmatia, claiming that Venetian rule had been beneficial for all Dalmatians and had been accepted by the Dalmatian population. The fascists were outraged after World War I, when the agreement between Italy and the Entente Allies in the Treaty of London of 1915 to have Dalmatia join Italy was revoked in 1919. The fascist regime supported the annexation of Yugoslavia's region of Slovenia into Italy that already held a portion of the Slovene population, whereby Slovenia would become an Italian province, resulting in a quarter of Slovene ethnic territory and approximately 327,000 out of a total population of 1.3 million Slovenes being subjected to forced Italianization. The fascist regime imposed mandatory Italianization upon the German and South Slavic populations living within Italy's borders. The fascist regime abolished the teaching of minority German and Slavic languages in schools, German and Slavic language newspapers were shut down and geographical and family names in areas of German or Slavic languages were to be Italianized. This resulted in significant violence against South Slavs deemed to be resisting Italianization. The fascist regime supported the annexation of Albania, claimed that Albanians were ethnically linked to Italians through links with the prehistoric Italiotes, Illyrian and Roman populations and that the major influence exerted by the Roman and Venetian empires over Albania justified Italy's right to possess it. The fascist regime also justified the annexation of Albania on the basis that—because several hundred thousand people of Albanian descent had been absorbed into society in southern Italy already—the incorporation of Albania was a reasonable measure that would unite people of Albanian descent into one state. The fascist regime endorsed Albanian irredentism, directed against the predominantly Albanian-populated Kosovo and Epirus, particularly in Chameria inhabited by a substantial number of Albanians. After Italy annexed Albania in 1939, the fascist regime endorsed assimilating Albanians into Italians and colonizing Albania with Italian settlers from the Italian Peninsula to gradually transform it into an Italian land. The fascist regime claimed the Ionian Islands as Italian territory on the basis that the islands had belonged to the Venetian Republic from the mid-14th until the late 18th century.

To the west of Italy, the fascists claimed that the territories of Corsica, Nice and Savoy held by France were Italian lands. During the period of Italian unification in 1860 to 1861, Prime Minister of Piedmont-Sardinia, Camillo Benso, Count of Cavour, who was leading the unification effort, faced opposition from French Emperor Napoleon III who indicated that France would oppose Italian unification unless France was given Nice and Savoy that were held by Piedmont-Sardinia, as France did not want a powerful state having control of all the passages of the Alps. As a result, Piedmont-Sardinia was pressured to concede Nice and Savoy to France in exchange for France accepting the unification of Italy. The fascist regime produced literature on Corsica that presented evidence of the italianità (Italianness) of the island. The fascist regime produced literature on Nice that justified that Nice was an Italian land based on historic, ethnic and linguistic grounds. The fascists quoted Medieval Italian scholar Petrarch who said: "The border of Italy is the Var; consequently Nice is a part of Italy". The fascists quoted Italian national hero Giuseppe Garibaldi who said: "Corsica and Nice must not belong to France; there will come the day when an Italy mindful of its true worth will reclaim its provinces now so shamefully languishing under foreign domination". Mussolini initially pursued promoting annexation of Corsica through political and diplomatic means, believing that Corsica could be annexed to Italy through first encouraging the existing autonomist tendencies in Corsica and then the independence of Corsica from France, that would be followed by the annexation of Corsica into Italy.

To the north of Italy, the fascist regime in the 1930s had designs on the largely Italian-populated region of Ticino and the Romansch-populated region of Graubünden in Switzerland (the Romansch are a people with a Latin-based language). In November 1938, Mussolini declared to the Grand Fascist Council: "We shall bring our border to the Gotthard Pass". The fascist regime accused the Swiss government of oppressing the Romansch people in Graubünden. Mussolini argued that Romansch was an Italian dialect and thus Graubünden should be incorporated into Italy. Ticino was also claimed because the region had belonged to the Duchy of Milan from the mid-fourteenth century until 1515, as well as being inhabited by Italian speakers of Italian ethnicity. Claim was also raised on the basis that areas now part of Graubünden in the Mesolcina valley and Hinterrhein were held by the Milanese Trivulzio family, who ruled from the Mesocco Castle in the late 15th century. Also during the summer of 1940, Galeazzo Ciano met with Hitler and Ribbentrop and proposed to them the dissection of Switzerland along the central chain of the Western Alps, which would have left Italy also with the canton of Valais in addition to the claims raised earlier.

To the south, the regime claimed the archipelago of Malta, which had been held by the British since 1800. Mussolini claimed that the Maltese language was a dialect of Italian and theories about Malta being the cradle of the Latin civilization were promoted. Italian had been widely used in Malta in the literary, scientific and legal fields and it was one of Malta's official languages until 1937 when its status was abolished by the British as a response to Italy's invasion of Ethiopia. Italian irredentists had claimed that territories on the coast of North Africa were Italy's Fourth Shore and used the historical Roman rule in North Africa as a precedent to justify the incorporation of such territories to Italian jurisdiction as being a "return" of Italy to North Africa. In January 1939, Italy annexed territories in Libya that it considered within Italy's Fourth Shore, with Libya's four coastal provinces of Tripoli, Misurata, Benghazi and Derna becoming an integral part of metropolitan Italy. At the same time, indigenous Libyans were given the ability to apply for "Special Italian Citizenship" which required such people to be literate in the Italian language and confined this type of citizenship to be valid in Libya only. Tunisia that had been taken by France as a protectorate in 1881 had the highest concentration of Italians in North Africa and its seizure by France had been viewed as an injury to national honour in Italy at what they perceived as a "loss" of Tunisia from Italian plans to incorporate it. Upon entering World War II, Italy declared its intention to seize Tunisia as well as the province of Constantine of Algeria from France.

To the south, the fascist regime held an interest in expanding Italy's African colonial possessions. In the 1920s, Italy regarded Portugal as a weak country that was unbecoming of a colonial power due to its weak hold on its colonies and mismanagement of them and as such Italy desired to annexe Portugal's colonies. Italy's relations with Portugal were influenced by the rise to power of the authoritarian conservative nationalist regime of Salazar, which borrowed fascist methods, though Salazar upheld Portugal's traditional alliance with Britain.

Race 

In a 1921 speech in Bologna, Mussolini stated that "Fascism was born ... out of a profound, perennial need of this our Aryan and Mediterranean race". In this speech, Mussolini referred to the Italians as people who constituted the Mediterranean branch of the Aryan Race, Aryan meant people whose language and culture were both Indo-European. Italian fascism emphasized the belief that race was bound by spiritual and cultural foundations and it divided people into a racial hierarchy which was based on spiritual and cultural factors. While Italian fascism based its conception of race on spiritual and cultural factors, Mussolini explicitly rejected the belief that biologically "pure" races were still considered a relevant factor in racial classifications. He claimed that italianità had assimilatory capacity. It used spiritual and cultural conceptions of race to make land claims on Dalmatia and to justify an Italian sphere of influence in the Balkans based on then-present and historical Italian cultural influence in the Balkans. The fascist regime justified colonialism in Africa by claiming that the spiritual and cultural superiority of Italians as part of the white race justified the right for Italy and other white powers to rule over the black race, while asserting the racial segregation of whites and blacks in its colonies. It claimed that fascism's colonial goals were to civilize the inferior races and defend the purity of Western civilization from racial miscegenation that it claimed would harm the intellectual qualities of the white race. It claimed that the white race needed to increase its natality in order to avoid being overtaken by the black and yellow races that were multiplying at a faster rate than whites.

Within Italy, within the Italian Empire and within the territory which was identified as spazio vitale or vital space for Italy, the belief in the existence of a cultural-racial hierarchy in which different peoples were ranked in terms of their values was clearly defined by 1940, during which plans for the acquisition of Italy's spazio vitale were being formalized by the regime. The fascist regime considered Italians to be superior to other peoples which lived in the Mediterranean region—including Latin, Slavic and Hellenic peoples—because only Italians had achieved racial unity and full political consciousness via the fascist regime. Latin, Slavic and Hellenic peoples were all considered superior to Turkic, Semitic and Hamitic peoples. According to the racial hierarchy's classification of the indigenous peoples of Africa, the indigenous North Africans were superior to the indigenous people of Italian East Africa.

Even though it believed that Europeans were racially superior to non-Europeans, the fascist regime treated non-Europeans with diplomatic courtesy. The regime formed an alliance with Japan, an alliance which was referred to as the Tripartite Pact between Germany, Italy and Japan. The Indian independence movement's leader Mahatma Gandhi visited Italy in 1931 and he was invited for a personal visit by Mussolini, who treated him with full diplomatic courtesy. During his transatlantic flight from Italy to the United States in 1933, the fascist official Italo Balbo visited leaders of the Sioux tribe and he accepted the Sioux's honorary bestowing of his incorporation into the Sioux with the Sioux position and name "Chief Flying Eagle".

Italian fascism strongly rejected the common Nordicist conception of the Aryan Race that idealized "pure" Aryans as having certain physical traits that were defined as Nordic such as blond hair and blue eyes. Nordicism was divisive because Italians – and especially southern Italians - had been subjected to discrimination by Nordicist proponents in countries like the United States based on the belief that non-Nordic southern Europeans were inferior to Nordics. In Italy, the influence of Nordicism had a divisive effect because Northern Italians who were influenced by Nordicism considered themselves a civilized people, in contrast to Southern Italians, who they considered biologically inferior to Northern Italians. At least some of the stereotypes of Southern Italians were created by Cesare Lombroso, an Italian Jewish criminologist and anthropologist who was of Sephardic descent. For his controversial theories, Lombroso was expelled from the Italian Society of Anthropology and Ethnology in 1882. The Lombrosian doctrine is currently considered pseudoscientific.

Mussolini and other fascists treated Nordicism with antipathy because they believed that people of Mediterranean racial heritage had an inferiority complex which had been instilled in them by German and Anglo-Saxon Nordicists who considered Mediterranean peoples racially degenerate and therefore inferior to Nordic peoples. However, the traditional Nordicist belief that Mediterraneans were degenerate due to the fact that they had a darker skin colour than Nordics had long been rebuked in anthropology as a result of the development of the depigmentation theory, a theory which claimed that lighter-skinned peoples had been depigmented from peoples who had a darker skin color, since its development, this theory has become a widely accepted view in anthropology. In his work The races of Europe (1939), the anthropologist Carleton S. Coon subscribed to the depigmentation theory, the theory which claimed that the Nordic race's light-coloured skin resulted from the depigmentation of the skin of its ancestors, who were members of the Mediterranean race. Mussolini refused to allow Italy to return again to this inferiority complex, initially rejecting Nordicism.

In the early 1930s, with the rise to power of the Nazi Party in Germany and with its Führer Adolf Hitler's staunch emphasis on a Nordicist conception of the Aryan Race, strong tensions with regard to racial issues arose between the fascists and the Nazis, because Hitler believed that Northern Italians were strongly Aryan. The Nazis believed that most of the ancient Romans were members of the Mediterranean race, and they believed that the members of the Roman ruling classes were also Nordic, descended from Aryan conquerors who migrated from the North, and in their view, this Nordic Aryan minority was responsible for the rise of Roman civilization. The Nazis viewed the downfall of the Roman Empire as being the result of the deterioration of the purity of the Nordic Aryan ruling class through its intermixing with the inferior Mediterranean types, a process that led to the empire's decay. In addition, racial intermixing in the population, in general, was also blamed for Rome's downfall, according to this claim, Italians as a whole were a hybrid of races, including black African races. Due to the darker complexion of Mediterranean peoples, Hitler regarded them as having traces of Negroid blood so in his view, they were not pure Aryans and as a result, they were inferior to people who did not have such a racial heritage. The Nazis ascribed the great achievements of post-Roman era northern Italians to the presence of a Nordic racial heritage in such people who had Germanic ancestors via their Nordic heritage, such as the Nazi ideologist Alfred Rosenberg, who believed that Michelangelo and Leonardo da Vinci were exemplary Nordic men of history. However, the Nazis did claim that aside from biologically Nordic people that a Nordic soul could inhabit a non-Nordic body. Hitler emphasized the role of Germanic influence in Northern Italy, for example, he stated that the art of Northern Italy was "nothing but pure German" art.

In the aftermath of the killing of the Austrian Chancellor Engelbert Dollfuss , an ally of Italy by Austrian Nazis in 1934, Mussolini became enraged and he responded to the killing of Engelbert Dollfuss by angrily denouncing Nazism. Mussolini rebuked Nazism's Nordicism, claiming that the Nazis' belief in the existence of a common Nordic "Germanic race" was absurd by saying that "a Germanic race does not exist. [...] We repeat. Does not exist. Scientists say so. Hitler says so". The fact that Germans were not purely Nordic was indeed acknowledged by the prominent Nazi racial theorist Hans F. K. Günther in his 1922 book Rassenkunde des deutschen Volkes (Racial Science of the German People), where Günther recognized Germans as being composed of five racial types, namely Nordic, Mediterranean, Dinaric, Alpine and East Baltic while asserting that the Nordics were the highest in a racial hierarchy of the five types.

By 1936, the tensions between fascist Italy and Nazi Germany were reduced and relations between the two regimes became more amicable as a result. In 1936, Mussolini decided to launch a racial programme in Italy and he was interested in the racial studies which were being conducted by Giulio Cogni. Cogni was a Nordicist, but he did not equate Nordic identity with Germanic identity as was commonly done by German Nordicists. Cogni had travelled to Germany where he was impressed by Nazi racial theories and he sought to develop his own racial theories. On 11 September 1936, Cogni sent Mussolini a copy of his newly published book Il Razzismo (1936). Cogni declared that the Mediterranean and Nordic racial subtypes of the Aryan race had a racial affinity and he also claimed that the intermixing of Nordic Aryans and Mediterranean Aryans in Italy produced a superior synthesis of Aryan Italians. Cogni addressed the racial differences which existed between northern and southern Italians, declaring that Southern Italians were a mixture of Aryan and non-Aryan races, he claimed that this mixture was most likely due to infiltration by Asiatic peoples in Roman times and later Arab invasions. As a result, Cogni believed that Southern Italian Mediterraneans were polluted by orientalizing tendencies. He would later change his view and claim that Nordics and Southern Italians were closely related groups, both racially and spiritually, because they were generally responsible for the creation of what is considered the best of European civilization. Initially, Mussolini was not impressed with Cogni's work, but Cogni's ideas were incorporated into the official fascist racial policy several years later.

In 1938, Mussolini began to fear that if Italian fascism did not recognize the Nordic heritage which existed within Italians, the Mediterranean inferiority complex would return to Italian society. Therefore, in the summer of 1938, the fascist government officially recognized the Italians as having a Nordic heritage and it also recognized them as being of Nordic-Mediterranean descent in a meeting with PNF members. In June 1938 in a meeting with PNF members, Mussolini identified himself as being of Nordic descent and he also declared that the previous policy which focused on Mediterraneanism would be replaced with a policy which would focus on Aryanism.

The fascist regime began its publication of the racialist magazine La Difesa della Razza in 1938. The Nordicist racial theorist Guido Landra took a major role in the early work of La Difesa and published the Manifesto of Racial Scientists in the magazine in 1938.

The Manifesto directly addressed its conception of racism and it also emphasized its autonomy from German racial theories by stating: 

The emphasis on a psychological model of a superior human being as it was described in the Manifesto was written in reference to the views of the Italian antisemitic racial theorists Giovanni Papini and Paolo Orano, who stated that those Jews who had classified themselves as Italians were examples of inferior psychological types that were considered morally abject, false and cowardly, types that could not be associated with the Italian community. After Article 7 of the Manifesto, the remainder of it claimed that peoples which were members of the Oriental race, African races and Jews, did not belong to the Italian race; and Article 10 declared that the physical and psychological characteristics of the Italian people must not be altered by crossbreeding with non-European races.

The Manifesto was strongly criticized, especially its assertion that Italians were a "pure race", because critics considered the notion absurd. La Difesa published other theories that described long-term Nordic Aryan amongst Italians, such as the theory that in the Eneolithic age Nordic Aryans arrived in Italy. Many of the writers of La Difesa della Razza took up the traditional Nordicist claim that the decline and fall of the Roman Empire was due to the arrival of Semitic immigrants. La Difesa'''s writers were divided on their claims as to how Italians extricated themselves from Semitic influence.

The Nordicist direction of fascist racial policy was challenged in 1938 by a resurgence of the Mediterranean faction of the PNF. By 1939, the Mediterraneanists advocated a nativist racial theory which rejected ascribing the achievements of the Italian people to Nordic peoples. This nativist racial policy was prominently promoted by Ugo Rellini. Rellini rejected the notion of large-scale invasions of Italy by Nordic Aryans in the Eneolithic age and claimed that the Italians were an indigenous people who were descended from the Cro-Magnons. Rellini claimed that Mediterranean and later Nordic peoples arrived in small numbers and peacefully intermixed with the indigenous Italian population.

In 1941, the PNF's Mediterraneanists put forward a comprehensive definition of the Italian race through the influence of Giacomo Acerbo. However, these efforts were challenged by Mussolini's endorsement of Nordicist figures with the appointment of the staunch spiritual Nordicist Alberto Luchini as the head of Italy's Racial Office in May 1941, as well as by Mussolini's increasing interest in Julius Evola's spiritual Nordicism in late 1941. Acerbo and the Mediterraneanists in his High Council on Demography and Race sought to bring the regime back to supporting Mediterraneanism by thoroughly denouncing the pro-Nordicist Manifesto of the Racial Scientists. The Council recognized Aryans as being a linguistic-based group and condemned the Manifesto for denying the influence of pre-Aryan civilization on modern Italy, saying that the Manifesto "constitutes an unjustifiable and undemonstrable negation of the anthropological, ethnological, and archaeological discoveries that have occurred and are occurring in our country". Furthermore, the Council denounced the Manifesto for "implicitly" crediting Germanic invaders of Italy in the guise of the Lombards for having "a formative influence on the Italian race in a disproportional degree to the number of invaders and to their biological predominance". The Council claimed that the obvious superiority of the ancient Greeks and Romans in comparison with the ancient Germanic tribes made it inconceivable that Italian culture owed a debt to ancient Aryan Germans. The Council denounced the Manifesto's Nordicist supremacist attitude towards Mediterraneans that it claimed was "considering them as slaves" and was "a repudiation of the entire Italian civilization".

 Attitude and policies regarding Jews 

In his early years as the ruler of Fascist Italy, Mussolini harboured negative stereotypes of Jews, but he did not hold a firm stance on Jews and his official stances oscillated and shifted to meet the political demands of the various factions of the fascist movement, so they were not concrete. Mussolini had held antisemitic beliefs prior to becoming a fascist, such as in a 1908 essay on the topic of Nietzsche's Übermensch, in which Mussolini condemned "pallid Judeans" for "wrecking" the Roman Empire; and in 1913 as editor of the Italian Socialist Party's (PSI) Avanti! newspaper again wrote about the Jews having caused havoc in ancient Rome. Although Mussolini held these negative attitudes, he was aware that Italian Jews were a deeply integrated and small community in Italy who were by and large perceived favourably in Italy for fighting valiantly for Italy in World War I. Of the 117 original members of the Fasci Italiani di Combattimento founded on 23 March 1919, five were Jewish. Since the movement's early years, there were a small number of prominent openly antisemitic fascists such as Roberto Farinacci. There were also prominent fascists who completely rejected antisemitism, such as Italo Balbo, who lived in Ferrara, which had a substantial Jewish community that was accepted, and as a result, antisemitic incidents were rare in the city.

In response to his observation of large numbers of Jews amongst the Bolsheviks and claims that the Bolsheviks and Germany (that Italy was fighting in World War I) were politically connected, Mussolini made antisemitic statements involving the Bolshevik-German connection as being an "unholy alliance between Hindenburg and the synagogue". Mussolini came to believe rumours that Bolshevik leader Vladimir Lenin was of Jewish descent. In an article in Il Popolo d'Italia in June 1919, Mussolini wrote a highly antisemitic analysis on the situation in Europe involving Bolshevism following the October Revolution, the Russian Civil War and war in Hungary involving the Hungarian Soviet Republic: 

This statement by Mussolini on a Jewish-Bolshevik-plutocratic connection and conspiracy was met with opposition in the fascist movement, resulting in Mussolini responding to this opposition amongst his supporters by abandoning this stance shortly afterwards in 1919. Upon abandoning this stance due to opposition to it, Mussolini no longer said his previous assertion that Bolshevism was Jewish, but warned that due to the large numbers of Jews in the Bolshevik movement the rise of Bolshevism in Russia would result in a ferocious wave of antisemitism in Russia. He then claimed that "antisemitism is foreign to the Italian people", but warned Zionists that they should be careful not to stir up antisemitism in "the only country where it has not existed".

Margherita Sarfatti was an influential Jewish member of the PNF whom Mussolini had known since he and she had been members of the PSI and she had been his mistress and helped write Dux (1926), a biography of Mussolini. One of the Jewish financial supporters of the fascist movement was Toeplitz, whom Mussolini had earlier accused of being a traitor during World War I. Another prominent Jewish Italian fascist was Ettore Ovazza, who was a staunch Italian nationalist and an opponent of Zionism in Italy. 230 Italian Jews took part in the fascists' March on Rome in 1922. In the early 1920s, Mussolini was cautious on topics of Italian Jewish financiers that arose from time to time from antisemitic elements in the fascist movement, while he regarded them as untrustworthy he believed that he could draw them to his side. In 1932, Mussolini made his private attitude about Jews known to the Austrian ambassador when discussing the issue by saying: "I have no love for the Jews, but they have great influence everywhere. It is better to leave them alone. Hitler's antisemitism has already brought him more enemies than is necessary".

On the eve of the March on Rome, the leadership of the PNF declared that  "a Jewish question does not exist in our country and let us hope that there never shall be one, at least not until Zionism poses Italian Jews with the dilemma of choosing between their Italian homeland and another homeland". The relations between the regime and Jews as in those practising the religion of Judaism was affected by the fascists' accommodation of the Catholic Church beginning in the early 1920s in which it sought to remove previous provisions of equality of faiths and impose state support of the supremacy of Catholicism.

In 1928, frustration with Zionism arose in the regime and Mussolini addressed the Italian Zionist Congress by publicly posing a question to Italy's Jews about their self-identity: "Are you a religion or are you a nation?". Zionist and anti-Zionist Jews responded, the anti-Zionist Jews professed that they were religious Jews as part of the Italian nation, while the Zionist Jews declared that there was no dispute between the Zionist movement and the Italian nation and they also said that all Italian Jews held patriotic respect for Italy. Upon these responses arriving, Mussolini declared that these revealed that a Jewish problem existed in terms of Jewish identity in Italy as a result of conflicting national loyalties amongst Zionist Jews by saying: 

At that time, the fascists were not wholly opposed to Zionism, instead, they took an instrumental approach to it, they were hostile to it when it caused conflicts with Italy's Catholic community and they were also hostile to some Zionists when they believed that those Zionists were supporting British interests, but they were favourable to Zionists who opposed the British and sought Italy's support and protection. In the early 1930s, Mussolini held discussions with Zionist leadership figures over proposals to encourage the emigration of Italian Jews to the mandate of Palestine, as Mussolini hoped that the presence of pro-Italian Jews in the region would weaken pro-British sentiment and potentially overturn the British mandate.

At the 1934 Montreux Fascist conference which was chaired by the Italian-led Comitati d'Azione per l'Universalita di Roma (CAUR) that sought to found a Fascist International, the issue of antisemitism was debated about by various fascist parties, with some of them being more favourable to it and others being less favourable to it. Two final compromises were adopted, creating the official stance of the Fascist International: 

From 1934 to 1938, Italy hosted the Betar Naval Academy in Civitavecchia to train Zionist cadets under Betar leader Ze'ev Jabotinsky, on the grounds that a Jewish state would be in Italy's national interest.

In a discussion with the President of the World Zionist Organization Chaim Weizmann over requests for Italy to provide refuge for Jews fleeing Nazi Germany, Mussolini agreed that he would accept Jewish refugees but warned Weizmann about the consequences if such Jews harmed Italy by saying: 

Italian fascism's attitudes towards Zionism and Jews, in general, underwent a shift in response to the Second Italo-Ethiopian War. At the outset of the war, Mussolini sought to gain favourable support for Italy's intervention in Ethiopia and appealed to Zionists by offering them a solution to the Jewish question, in which Italy would set aside a certain amount of territory from conquered Ethiopia to be a homeland for Jews. Mussolini claimed that territory from conquered Ethiopia would make an ideal homeland for the Jews, noting that there were large numbers of Falasha already living there who identified as Jews. However, Zionist leaders rejected this proposal by saying that they would not have lived in East Africa, as they came from urbanized and developed regions in Europe and the United States. Mussolini viewed this as an offensive snub and responded in frustration saying: "If Ethiopia is good enough for my Italians why isn't it good enough for you Jews?". Afterwards, Mussolini's relations with the Zionist movement cooled and became aggravated with his observation that many Jews opposed the Italo-Ethiopian War, to which he responded: 

In 1936, the fascist regime began to promote racial antisemitism and Mussolini claimed that international Jewry had sided with Britain against Italy during Italy's war with Ethiopia. Historian Renzo De Felice believed that the fascist regime's pursuit of an alliance with Nazi Germany that began in 1936 explains the adoption of antisemitism as a pragmatic component of the pursuit of that alliance. De Felice's interpretation has been challenged by H. Stuart Hughes, who has claimed that direct Nazi pressure to adopt antisemitic policy had little or no impact on Mussolini's decision. Hughes notes that the fascist version of antisemitism was based on spiritualist considerations while eschewing anthropological or biological arguments, unlike the Nazi version of antisemitism. Italian fascism adopted antisemitism in the late 1930s and Mussolini personally returned to invoke antisemitic statements as he had done earlier. The fascist regime used antisemitic propaganda for the Spanish Civil War from 1937 to 1938 that emphasized that Italy was supporting Spain's Nationalist forces against a "Jewish International".

In 1938, fascist Italy passed the Italian racial laws which restricted the civil rights of Jews and forbid sexual relations and marriages between Italians and Jews. The adoption of such racial laws was met with opposition from fascist members including Balbo, who regarded antisemitism as having nothing to do with fascism and staunchly opposed the antisemitic laws.

 Totalitarianism 

In 1925, the PNF declared that Italy's fascist state would be totalitarian. The term "totalitarian" had initially been used as a pejorative accusation by Italy's liberal opposition that denounced the fascist movement for seeking to create a total dictatorship. However, the fascists responded by accepting that they were totalitarian, but presented totalitarianism from a positive viewpoint. Mussolini described totalitarianism as seeking to forge an authoritarian national state that would be capable of completing Risorgimento of the Italia Irredenta, forge a powerful modern Italy and create a new kind of citizen – politically active fascist Italians.

The Doctrine of Fascism (1932) described the nature of Italian fascism's totalitarianism, stating the following: 

American journalist H. R. Knickerbocker wrote in 1941: "Mussolini's Fascist state is the least terroristic of the three totalitarian states. The terror is so mild in comparison with the Soviet or Nazi varieties, that it almost fails to qualify as terroristic at all." As example he described an Italian journalist friend who refused to become a fascist. He was fired from his newspaper and put under 24-hour surveillance, but otherwise not harassed; his employment contract was settled for a lump sum and he was allowed to work for the foreign press. Knickerbocker contrasted his treatment with the inevitable torture and execution under Stalin or Hitler, and stated "you have a fair idea of the comparative mildness of the Italian kind of totalitarianism".

However, since World War II historians have noted that in Italy's colonies Italian fascism displayed extreme levels of violence. The deaths of one-tenth of the population of the Italian colony of Libya occurred during the fascist era, including from the use of gassings, concentration camps, starvation and disease; and in Ethiopia during the Second Italo-Ethiopian War and afterwards by 1938 a quarter of a million Ethiopians had died.

 Corporatist economics 
Italian fascism promoted a corporatist economic system. The economy involved employer and employee syndicates being linked together in corporative associations to collectively represent the nation's economic producers and work alongside the state to set national economic policy. Mussolini declared such economics as a "Third Alternative" to capitalism and Marxism that Italian fascism regarded as "obsolete doctrines". For instance, he said in 1935 that orthodox capitalism no longer existed in the country. Preliminary plans as of 1939 intended to divide the country into 22 corporations which would send representatives to Parliament from each industry.

State permission was required for almost any business activity, such as expanding a factory, merging a business, or to fire or lay off an employee. All wages were set by the government, and a minimum wage was imposed in Italy. Restrictions on labor increased. While corporations still could earn profits, Italian fascism supported criminalization of strikes by employees and lockouts by employers as illegal acts it deemed as prejudicial to the national community as a whole.

 Age and gender roles 
The Italian fascists' political anthem was called Giovinezza (Youth). Fascism identifies the physical age period of youth as a critical time for the moral development of people that will affect society.

Italian fascism pursued what it called "moral hygiene" of youth, particularly regarding sexuality. Fascist Italy promoted what it considered normal sexual behaviour in youth while denouncing what it considered deviant sexual behaviour. It condemned pornography, most forms of birth control and contraceptive devices (with the exception of the condom), homosexuality and prostitution as deviant sexual behaviour. Fascist Italy regarded the promotion of male sexual excitation before puberty as the cause of criminality amongst male youth. Fascist Italy reflected the belief of most Italians that homosexuality was wrong. Instead of the traditional Catholic teaching that it was a sin, a new approach was taken, based on the contemporary psychoanalysis, that it was a social disease. Fascist Italy pursued an aggressive campaign to reduce prostitution of young women.

Mussolini perceived women's primary role to be childbearers while men were warriors, once saying that "war is to man what maternity is to the woman". In an effort to increase birthrates, the Italian fascist government initiated policies designed to reduce a need for families to be dependent on a dual-income. The most evident policy to lessen female participation in the workplace was a program to encourage large families, where parents were given subsidies for a second child, and proportionally increased subsidies for a third, fourth, fifth, and sixth child. Italian fascism called for women to be honoured as "reproducers of the nation" and the Italian fascist government held ritual ceremonies to honour women's role within the Italian nation. In 1934, Mussolini declared that employment of women was a "major aspect of the thorny problem of unemployment" and that for women working was "incompatible with childbearing". Mussolini went on to say that the solution to unemployment for men was the "exodus of women from the work force". Although the initial Fascist Manifesto contained a reference to universal suffrage, this broad opposition to feminism meant that when it granted women the right to vote in 1925 it was limited purely to voting in local elections.Kevin Passmore, Women, Gender and Fascism in Europe, 1919-45. Rutgers University Press. 2003. p. 16 

 Tradition 
Italian fascism believed that the success of Italian nationalism required a clear sense of a shared past amongst the Italian people along with a commitment to a modernized Italy. In a famous speech in 1926, Mussolini called for fascist art that was "traditionalist and at the same time modern, that looks to the past and at the same time to the future".

Traditional symbols of Roman civilization were utilized by the fascists, particularly the fasces that symbolized unity, authority and the exercise of power. Other traditional symbols of ancient Rome used by the fascists included the she-wolf of Rome. The fasces and the she-wolf symbolized the shared Roman heritage of all the regions that constituted the Italian nation. In 1926, the fasces was adopted by the fascist government of Italy as a symbol of the state. In that year, the fascist government attempted to have the Italian national flag redesigned to incorporate the fasces on it. This attempt to incorporate the fasces on the flag was stopped by strong opposition to the proposal by Italian monarchists. Afterwards, the fascist government in public ceremonies rose the national tricolour flag along with a fascist black flag. Years later, and after Mussolini was forced from power by the King in 1943 only to be rescued by German forces, the Italian Social Republic founded by Mussolini and the fascists did incorporate the fasces on the state's war flag, which was a variant of the Italian tricolour national flag.

The issue of the rule of monarchy or republic in Italy was an issue that changed several times through the development of Italian fascism, as initially Italian fascism was republican and denounced the Savoy monarchy. However, Mussolini tactically abandoned republicanism in 1922 and recognized that the acceptance of the monarchy was a necessary compromise to gain the support of the establishment to challenge the liberal constitutional order that also supported the monarchy. King Victor Emmanuel III had become a popular ruler in the aftermath of Italy's gains after World War I and the army held close loyalty to the King, thus any idea of overthrowing the monarchy was discarded as foolhardy by the fascists at this point. Importantly, fascism's recognition of monarchy provided fascism with a sense of historical continuity and legitimacy. The fascists publicly identified King Victor Emmanuel II, the first King of a reunited Italy who had initiated the Risorgimento, along with other historic Italian figures such as Gaius Marius, Julius Caesar, Giuseppe Mazzini, Camillo Benso, Count of Cavour, Giuseppe Garibaldi and others, for being within a tradition of dictatorship in Italy that the fascists declared that they emulated. However, this compromise with the monarchy did not yield a cordial relationship between the King and Mussolini. Although Mussolini had formally accepted the monarchy, he pursued and largely achieved reducing the power of the King to that of a figurehead. The King initially held complete nominal legal authority over the military through the Statuto Albertino, but this was ended during the fascist regime when Mussolini created the position of First Marshal of the Empire in 1938, a two-person position of control over the military held by both the King and the head of government that had the effect of eliminating the King's previously exclusive legal authority over the military by giving Mussolini equal legal authority to the King over the military. In the 1930s, Mussolini became aggravated by the monarchy's continued existence due to envy of the fact that his counterpart in Germany Adolf Hitler was both head of state and head of government of a republic; and Mussolini in private denounced the monarchy and indicated that he had plans to dismantle the monarchy and create a republic with himself as head of state of Italy upon an Italian success in the then-anticipated major war about to erupt in Europe.

After being removed from office and placed under arrest by the King in 1943, with the Kingdom of Italy's new non-fascist government switching sides from the Axis to the Allies, Italian fascism returned to republicanism and condemnation of the monarchy. On 18 September 1943, Mussolini made his first public address to the Italian people since his rescue from arrest by allied German forces, in which he commended the loyalty of Hitler as an ally while condemning King Victor Emmanuel III of the Kingdom of Italy for betraying Italian fascism. On the topic of the monarchy removing him from power and dismantling the fascist regime, Mussolini stated: "It is not the regime that has betrayed the monarchy, it is the monarchy that has betrayed the regime" and that "When a monarchy fails in its duties, it loses every reason for being. ... The state we want to establish will be national and social in the highest sense of the word; that is, it will be fascist, thus returning to our origins". The fascists at this point did not denounce the House of Savoy in the entirety of its history and credited Victor Emmanuel II for his rejection of "scornfully dishonourable pacts" and denounced Victor Emmanuel III for betraying Victor Emmanuel II by entering a dishonourable pact with the Allies.

The relationship between Italian fascism and the Catholic Church was mixed, as originally the fascists were highly anti-clerical and hostile to Catholicism, though from the mid to late 1920s anti-clericalism lost ground in the movement as Mussolini in power sought to seek accord with the Church as the Church held major influence in Italian society with most Italians being Catholic. In 1929, the Italian government signed the Lateran Treaty with the Holy See, a concordat between Italy and the Catholic Church that allowed for the creation of a small enclave known as Vatican City as a sovereign state representing the papacy. This ended years of perceived alienation between the Church and the Italian government after Italy annexed the Papal States in 1870. Italian fascism justified its adoption of antisemitic laws in 1938 by claiming that Italy was fulfilling the Christian religious mandate of the Catholic Church that had been initiated by Pope Innocent III in the Fourth Lateran Council of 1215, whereby the Pope issued strict regulation of the life of Jews in Christian lands. Jews were prohibited from holding any public office that would give them power over Christians and Jews were required to wear distinctive clothing to distinguish them from Christians.

 Doctrine The Doctrine of Fascism (La dottrina del fascismo, 1932) by the actualist philosopher Giovanni Gentile is the official formulation of Italian fascism, published under Benito Mussolini's name in 1933. Gentile was intellectually influenced by Hegel, Plato, Benedetto Croce and Giambattista Vico, thus his actual idealism philosophy was the basis for fascism. Hence, the Doctrines Weltanschauung proposes the world as action in the realm of humanity – beyond the quotidian constrictions of contemporary political trend, by rejecting "perpetual peace" as fantastical and accepting Man as a species continually at war; those who meet the challenge, achieve nobility. To wit, actual idealism generally accepted that conquerors were the men of historical consequence, e.g. the Roman Julius Caesar, the Greek Alexander the Great, the Frank Charlemagne and the French Napoleon. The philosopher–intellectual Gentile was especially inspired by the Roman Empire (27 BC – AD 476, 1453), from whence derives fascism: 

In 1925, Mussolini assumed the title Duce (Leader), derived from the Latin dux (leader), a Roman Republic military-command title. Moreover, although fascist Italy (1922–1943) is historically considered an authoritarian–totalitarian dictatorship, it retained the original "liberal democratic" government façade: the Grand Council of Fascism remained active as administrators; and King Victor Emmanuel III of Italy could—at the risk of his crown—dismiss Mussolini as Italian Prime Minister as in the event he did.

Gentile defined fascism as an anti-intellectual doctrine, epistemologically based on faith rather than reason. Fascist mysticism emphasized the importance of political myths, which were true not as empirical facts, but as "metareality". Fascist art, architecture and symbols constituted a process which converted Fascism into a sort of a civil religion or political religion. La dottrina del fascismo states that fascism is a "religious conception of life" and forms a "spiritual community" in contrast to bourgeois materialism. The slogan Credere Obbedire Combattere ("Believe, Obey, Fight") reflects the importance of political faith in fascism.

According to historian Zeev Sternhell, "most syndicalist leaders were among the founders of the fascist movement", who in later years gained key posts in Mussolini's regime. Mussolini expressed great admiration for the ideas of Georges Sorel, who he claimed was instrumental in birthing the core principles of Italian fascism. J. L. Talmon argued that fascism billed itself "not only as an alternative, but also as the heir to socialism".La dottrina del fascismo proposed an Italy of greater living standards under a one-party fascist system than under the multi-party liberal democratic government of 1920. As the leader of the National Fascist Party (PNF, Partito Nazionale Fascista), Mussolini said that democracy is "beautiful in theory; in practice, it is a fallacy" and spoke of celebrating the burial of the "putrid corpse of liberty". In 1923, to give Deputy Mussolini control of the pluralist parliamentary government of the Kingdom of Italy (1861–1946), an economist, the Baron Giacomo Acerbo, proposed—and the Italian Parliament approved—the Acerbo Law, changing the electoral system from proportional representation to majority representation. The party who received the most votes (provided they possessed at least 25 percent of cast votes) won two-thirds of the parliament; the remaining third was proportionately shared among the other parties, thus the fascist manipulation of liberal democratic law that rendered Italy a one-party state.

In 1924, the PNF won the election with 65 percent of the votes, yet the United Socialist Party refused to accept such a defeat—especially Deputy Giacomo Matteotti, who on 30 May 1924 in Parliament formally accused the PNF of electoral fraud and reiterated his denunciations of PNF Blackshirt political violence and was publishing The Fascisti Exposed: A Year of Fascist Domination, a book substantiating his accusations.Speech of the 30th of May 1924  the last speech of Matteotti, from it.wikisource Consequently, on 24 June 1924, the Ceka (ostensibly a party secret police, modelled on the Soviet Cheka) assassinated Matteotti and of the five men arrested, Amerigo Dumini, also known as Sicario del Duce (The Leader's Assassin), was sentenced to five years' imprisonment, but served only eleven months and was freed under amnesty from King Victor Emmanuel III. Moreover, when the King supported Prime Minister Mussolini the socialists quit Parliament in protest, leaving the fascists to govern unopposed. In that time, assassination was not yet the modus operandi norm and the Italian fascist Duce usually disposed of opponents in the Imperial Roman way: political arrest punished with island banishment.

 Conditions precipitating fascism 

 Nationalist discontent 
After World War I (1914–1918), despite the Kingdom of Italy (1861–1946) being a full-partner Allied Power against the Central Powers, Italian nationalism claimed Italy was cheated in the Treaty of Saint-Germain-en-Laye (1919), thus the Allies had impeded Italy's progress to becoming a "Great Power". Thenceforth, the PNF successfully exploited that "slight" to Italian nationalism in presenting fascism as best-suited for governing the country by successfully claiming that democracy, socialism and liberalism were failed systems. The PNF assumed Italian government in 1922, consequent to the fascist Leader Mussolini's oratory and Blackshirt paramilitary political violence.

At the Paris Peace Conference in 1919, the Allies compelled the Kingdom of Italy to yield to Yugoslavia the Croatian seaport of Fiume (Rijeka), a mostly Italian city of little nationalist significance, until early 1919. Moreover, elsewhere Italy was then excluded from the wartime secret Treaty of London (1915) it had concorded with the Triple Entente; wherein Italy was to leave the Triple Alliance and join the enemy by declaring war against the German Empire and Austria-Hungary in exchange for territories at war's end, upon which the Kingdom of Italy held claims (see Italia irredenta).

In September 1919, the nationalist response of outraged war hero Gabriele D'Annunzio was declaring the establishment of the Italian Regency of Carnaro. To his independent Italian state, he installed himself as the Regent Duce and promulgated the Carta del Carnaro (Charter of Carnaro, 8 September 1920), a politically syncretic constitutional amalgamation of right-wing and left-wing anarchist, proto-fascist and democratic republican politics, which much influenced the politico-philosophic development of early Italian fascism. Consequent to the Treaty of Rapallo (1920), the metropolitan Italian military deposed the Regency of Duce D'Annunzio on Christmas 1920. In the development of the fascist model of government, D'Annunzio was a nationalist and not a fascist, whose legacy of political–praxis ("Politics as Theatre") was stylistic (ceremony, uniform, harangue and chanting) and not substantive, which Italian Fascism artfully developed as a government model.Roger Eatwell. Fascism: A History. Penguin Books. 1995. p. 49. 

At the same time, Mussolini and many of his revolutionary syndicalist adherents gravitated towards a form of revolutionary nationalism in an effort to "identify the 'communality' of man not with class, but with the nation". According to A. James Gregor, Mussolini came to believe that "Fascism was the only form of 'socialism' appropriate to the proletarian nations of the twentieth century" while he was in the process of shifting his views from socialism to nationalism. Enrico Corradini, one of the early influences on Mussolini's thought and later a member of his administration, championed the concept of proletarian nationalism, writing about Italy in 1910: "We are the proletarian people in respect to the rest of the world. Nationalism is our socialism". Mussolini would come to use similar wording, for instance referring to fascist Italy during World War II as the "proletarian nations that rise up against the plutocrats".

 Labor unrest 

Given Italian fascism's pragmatic political amalgamations of left-wing and right-wing socio-economic policies, discontented workers and peasants proved an abundant source of popular political power, especially because of peasant opposition to socialist agricultural collectivism. Thus armed, the former socialist Benito Mussolini oratorically inspired and mobilized country and working-class people: "We declare war on socialism, not because it is socialist, but because it has opposed nationalism". Moreover, for campaign financing in the 1920–1921 period the National fascist Party also courted the industrialists and (historically feudal) landowners by appealing to their fears of left-wing socialist and Bolshevik labor politics and urban and rural strikes. The fascists promised a good business climate of cost-effective labor, wage and political stability; and the fascist Party was en route to power.

Historian Charles F. Delzell reports: "At first, the fascist Revolutionary Party was concentrated in Milan and a few other cities. They gained ground quite slowly, between 1919 and 1920; not until after the scare, brought about by the workers "occupation of the factories" in the late summer of 1920 did fascism become really widespread. The industrialists began to throw their financial support behind Mussolini after he renamed his party and retracted his former support for Lenin and the Russian Revolution. Moreover, toward the end of 1920, fascism began to spread into the countryside, bidding for the support of large landowners, particularly in the area between Bologna and Ferrara, a traditional stronghold of the Left, and scene of frequent violence. Socialist and Catholic organizers of farm hands in that region, Venezia Giulia, Tuscany, and even distant Apulia, were soon attacked by Blackshirt squads of fascists, armed with castor oil, blackjacks, and more lethal weapons. The era of squadrismo and nightly expeditions to burn Socialist and Catholic labor headquarters had begun. During this time period, Mussolini's fascist squads also engaged in violent attacks against the Church where "several priests were assassinated and churches burned by the fascists".

 Fascism empowered 
Italy's use of daredevil elite shock troops, known as the Arditi, beginning in 1917, was an important influence on fascism. The Arditi were soldiers who were specifically trained for a life of violence and wore unique blackshirt uniforms and fezzes. The Arditi formed a national organization in November 1918, the Associazione fra gli Arditi d'Italia, which by mid-1919 had about twenty thousand young men within it. Mussolini appealed to the Arditi and the Fascists' squadristi, developed after the war, were based upon the Arditi.

World War I inflated Italy's economy with great debts, unemployment (aggravated by thousands of demobilised soldiers), social discontent featuring strikes, organised crime and anarchist, socialist and communist insurrections. When the elected Italian Liberal Party Government could not control Italy, the fascist leader Mussolini took matters in hand, combating those issues with the Blackshirts, paramilitary squads of First World War veterans and ex socialists when Prime Ministers such as Giovanni Giolitti allowed the fascists taking the law in hand. The violence between socialists and the mostly self-organized squadristi militias, especially in the countryside, had increased so dramatically that Mussolini was pressured to call a truce to bring about "reconciliation with the Socialists". Signed in early August 1921, Mussolini and the Italian Socialist Party (PSI) agreed to the Pact of Pacification, which was immediately condemned by most ras leaders in the squadrismo. The peace pact was officially denounced during the Third Fascist Congress on 7–10 November 1921.

The Liberal government preferred fascist class collaboration to the Communist Party of Italy's class conflict should they assume government as had Vladimir Lenin's Bolsheviks in the recent Russian Revolution of 1917, although Mussolini had originally praised Lenin's October Revolution and publicly referred to himself in 1919 as "Lenin of Italy".The Manifesto of the Fascist Struggle (June 1919) of the PFR presented the politico-philosophic tenets of fascism. The manifesto was authored by national syndicalist Alceste De Ambris and Futurist movement leader Filippo Tommaso Marinetti. The manifesto was divided into four sections, describing the movement's objectives in political, social, military and financial fields.

By the early 1920s, popular support for the fascist movement's fight against Bolshevism numbered some 250,000 people. In 1921, the fascists metamorphosed into the PNF and achieved political legitimacy when Mussolini was elected to the Chamber of Deputies in 1922. Although the Liberal Party retained power, the governing prime ministries proved ephemeral, especially that of the fifth Prime Minister Luigi Facta, whose government proved vacillating.

To depose the weak parliamentary democracy, Deputy Mussolini (with military, business and liberal right-wing support) launched the PNF March on Rome (27–29 October 1922) coup d'état to oust Prime Minister Luigi Facta and assume the government of Italy to restore nationalist pride, restart the economy, increase productivity with labor controls, remove economic business controls and impose law and order. On 28 October, whilst the "March" occurred, King Victor Emmanuel III withdrew his support of Prime Minister Facta and appointed PNF Leader Benito Mussolini as the sixth Prime Minister of Italy.

The March on Rome became a victory parade: the fascists believed their success was revolutionary and traditionalist.

 Economy 

Until 1925, when the liberal economist Alberto de' Stefani, although a former member of the squadristi, was removed from his post as Minister of Economics (1922–1925), Italy's coalition government was able to restart the economy and balanced the national budget. Stefani developed economic policies that were aligned with classical liberalism principles as inheritance, luxury and foreign capital taxes were abolished; and life insurance (1923) and the state communications monopolies were privatised and so on. During Italy's coalition government era, pro-business policies apparently did not contradict the State's financing of banks and industry. Political scientist Franklin Hugh Adler referred to this coalition period between Mussolini's appointment as prime minister on 31 October 1922 and his 1925 dictatorship as "Liberal-Fascism, a hybrid, unstable, and transitory regime type under which the formal juridical-institutional framework of the liberal regime was conserved", which still allowed pluralism, competitive elections, freedom of the press and the right of trade unions to strike. Liberal Party leaders and industrialists thought that they could neutralize Mussolini by making him the head of a coalition government, where as Luigi Albertini remarked that "he will be much more subject to influence".

One of Prime Minister Mussolini's first acts was the 400-million-lira financing of Gio. Ansaldo & C., one of the country's most important engineering companies. Subsequent to the 1926 deflation crisis, banks such as the Banco di Roma (Bank of Rome), the Banco di Napoli (Bank of Naples) and the Banco di Sicilia (Bank of Sicily) also were state-financed. In 1924, a private business enterprise established Unione Radiofonica Italiana (URI) as part of the Marconi company, to which the Italian fascist Government granted official radio-broadcast monopoly. After the defeat of fascism in 1944, URI became Radio Audizioni Italiane (RAI) and was renamed RAI — Radiotelevisione Italiana with the advent of television in 1954.

Given the overwhelmingly rural nature of Italian economy in the period, agriculture was vital to fascist economic policies and propaganda. To strengthen the domestic Italian production of grain, the fascist Government established in 1925 protectionist policies that ultimately failed (see the Battle for Grain). 

From 1926 following the Pact of the Vidoni Palace and the Syndical Laws, business and labour were organized into 12 separate associations, outlawing or integrating all others. These organizations negotiated labour contracts on behalf of all its members with the state acting as the arbitrator. The state tended to favour big industry over small industry, commerce, banking, agriculture, labour and transport even though each sector officially had equal representation. Pricing, production and distribution practices were controlled by employer associations rather than individual firms and labour syndicates negotiated collective labour contracts binding all firms in the particular sector. Enforcement of contracts was difficult and the large bureaucracy delayed resolutions of labour disputes.

After 1929, the fascist regime countered the Great Depression with massive public works programs, such as the draining of the Pontine Marshes, hydroelectricity development, railway improvement and rearmament. In 1933, the Istituto per la Ricostruzione Industriale (IRI – Institute for Industrial Reconstruction) was established to subsidize failing companies and soon controlled important portions of the national economy via government-linked companies, among them Alfa Romeo. The Italian economy's Gross National Product increased 2 percent; automobile production was increased, especially that of the Fiat motor company; and the aeronautical industry was developing. Especially after the 1936 League of Nations sanctions against Italian invasion of Ethiopia, Mussolini strongly advocated agrarianism and autarchy as part of his economic "battles" for Land, the Lira and Grain. As Prime Minister, Mussolini physically participated with the workers in doing the work; the "politics as theatre" legacy of Gabriele D' Annunzio yielded great propaganda images of Il Duce as  "Man of the People".

A year after the creation of the IRI, Mussolini boasted to his Chamber of Deputies: "Three-fourths of the Italian economy, industrial and agricultural, is in the hands of the state".Carl Schmidt, The Corporate State in Action: Italy under Fascism, London: Victor Gollancz Ltd., 1939, pp. 153–76.  As Italy continued to nationalize its economy, the IRI "became the owner not only of the three most important Italian banks, which were clearly too big to fail, but also of the lion's share of the Italian industries". During this period, Mussolini identified his economic policies with "state capitalism" and "state socialism", which later was described as "economic dirigisme", an economic system where the state has the power to direct economic production and allocation of resources. By 1939, fascist Italy attained the highest rate of state–ownership of an economy in the world other than the Soviet Union, where the Italian state "controlled over four-fifths of Italy's shipping and shipbuilding, three-quarters of its pig iron production and almost half that of steel".

 Relations with the Catholic Church 
In the 19th century, the forces of Risorgimento (1815–1871) had conquered Rome and taken control of it away from the Papacy, which saw itself henceforth as a prisoner in the Vatican. In February 1929, as Italian Head of Government, Mussolini concluded the unresolved Church–State conflict of the Roman Question (La Questione romana) with the Lateran Treaty between the Kingdom of Italy and the Holy See, establishing the Vatican City microstate in Rome. Upon ratification of the Lateran Treaty, the papacy recognized the state of Italy in exchange for diplomatic recognition of the Vatican City, territorial compensations, introduction of religious education into all state funded schools in ItalyChambers Dictionary of World History. Larousse Kingfisher Chambers. 2000. pp. 464–65.  and 50 million pounds sterling that were shifted from Italian bank shares into a Swiss company Profima SA. British wartime records from the National Archives in Kew also confirmed Profima SA as the Vatican's company which was accused during WW II of engaging in "activities contrary to Allied interests". Cambridge historian John F. Pollard wrote in his book that this financial settlement ensured the "papacy [...] would never be poor again".

Not long after the Lateran Treaty was signed, Mussolini was almost "excommunicated" over his "intractable" determination to prevent the Vatican from having control over education. In reply, the Pope protested Mussolini's "pagan worship of the state" and the imposition of an "exclusive oath of obedience" that obligated everyone to uphold fascism. Once declaring in his youth that "religion is a species of mental disease", Mussolini "wanted the appearance of being greatly favoured by the Pope" while simultaneously "subordinate to no one". Mussolini's widow attested in her 1974 book that her husband was "basically irreligious until the later years of his life".

 Influence outside Italy 
The fascist government's model was very influential beyond Italy. In the twenty-one-year interbellum period, many political scientists and philosophers sought ideological inspiration from Italy. Mussolini's establishment of law and order to Italy and its society was praised by Winston Churchill, Sigmund Freud, George Bernard Shaw and Thomas Edison as the fascist government combated organised crime and the Sicilian Mafia.

Italian fascism was copied by Adolf Hitler's Nazi Party, the Russian Fascist Organization, the Romanian National Fascist Movement (the National Romanian Fascia, National Italo-Romanian Cultural and Economic Movement) and the Dutch fascists were based upon the Verbond van Actualisten journal of H. A. Sinclair de Rochemont and Alfred Haighton. The Sammarinese Fascist Party established an early fascist government in San Marino and their politico-philosophic basis essentially was Italian fascism. In the Kingdom of Yugoslavia, Milan Stojadinović established his Yugoslav Radical Union. They wore green shirts and Šajkača caps and used the Roman salute. Stojadinović also adopted the title of Vodja. In Switzerland, pro-Nazi Colonel Arthur Fonjallaz of the National Front became an ardent Mussolini admirer after visiting Italy in 1932 and advocated the Italian annexation of Switzerland whilst receiving fascist foreign aid. The country was host for two Italian politico-cultural activities: the International Centre for Fascist Studies (CINEF — Centre International d' Études Fascistes) and the 1934 congress of the Action Committee for the Universality of Rome (CAUR — Comitato d' Azione della Università de Roma). In Spain, the writer Ernesto Giménez Caballero in Genio de España (The Genius of Spain, 1932) called for the Italian annexation of Spain, led by Mussolini presiding an international Latin Roman Catholic empire. He then progressed to close associated with Falangism, leading to discarding the Spanish annexation to Italy.

 Italian fascist intellectuals 
 Benito Mussolini
 Massimo Bontempelli
 Giuseppe Bottai
 Enrico Corradini
 Carlo Costamagna
 Julius Evola
 Enrico Ferri
 Giovanni Gentile
 Corrado Gini
 Agostino Lanzillo
 Curzio Malaparte
 Filippo Tommaso Marinetti
 Robert Michels
 Angelo Oliviero Olivetti
 Sergio Panunzio
 Giovanni Papini
 Giuseppe Prezzolini
 Alfredo Rocco
 Edmondo Rossoni
 Margherita Sarfatti
 Ardengo Soffici
 Ugo Spirito
 Giuseppe Ungaretti
 Gioacchino Volpe

 Italian fascist slogans 

 Me ne frego ("I don't give a damn!"), the Italian fascist motto.
 Libro e moschetto, fascista perfetto ("Book and musket, perfect fascist").
 Tutto nello Stato, niente al di fuori dello Stato, nulla contro lo Stato ("Everything in the State, nothing outside the State, nothing against the State").
 Credere, obbedire, combattere ("Believe, Obey, Fight").
  Chi si ferma è perduto ("He who hesitates is lost").
 Se avanzo, seguitemi; se indietreggio, uccidetemi; se muoio, vendicatemi ("If I advance, follow me. If I retreat, kill me. If I die, avenge me"). Borrowed from French Royalist General Henri de la Rochejaquelein.
 Viva il Duce ("Long live the Leader").
 La guerra è per l'uomo come la maternità è per la donna ("War is to man as motherhood is to woman").
 Boia chi molla ("Who gives up is a rogue"); the first meaning of "boia" is "executioner, hangman", but in this context it means "scoundrel, rogue, villain, blackguard, knave, lowlife" and it can also be used as an exclamation of strong irritation or disappointment or as a pejoratively superlative adjective (e.g. tempo boia, "awful weather").
 Molti nemici, molto onore ("Many enemies, much Honor").
 È l'aratro che traccia il solco, ma è la spada che lo difende ("The plough cuts the furrow, but the sword defends it").
 Dux mea lux ("The Leader is my light"), Latin phrase.
 Duce, a noi ("Duce, to us").
 Mussolini ha sempre ragione ("Mussolini is always right").
 Vincere, e vinceremo ("To win, and we shall win!").

 See also 
 Definitions of fascism
 Economy of Italy under fascism
 Fascism
 Fascist architecture
 Fascist syndicalism
 Italian fascist states
 Kingdom of Italy (1922–1943; as a fascist state)
 Italian Social Republic (1943–1945)
 Model of masculinity under fascist Italy
 National Fascist Party
 Propaganda in Fascist Italy
 Italian fascism and racism
 Italian racial laws
 Neo-fascism
 Antisemitism in 21st-century Italy
 Racism in Italy
 Sicilian mafia during the Fascist regime
 Squadrismo

 References 

 Sources 
 "Labor Charter" (1927–1934).
 Mussolini, Benito. Doctrine of Fascism, which was published as part of the entry for fascismo in the Enciclopedia Italiana, 1932.
 Sorel, Georges. Reflections on Violence.

 Further reading 
 General 
 Acemoglu, Daron; De Feo, Giuseppe; De Luca, Giacomo; Russo, Gianluca (2022). "War, Socialism, and the Rise of Fascism: An Empirical Exploration". The Quarterly Journal of Economics De Felice, Renzo Interpretations of Fascism, translated by Brenda Huff Everett, Cambridge; London: Harvard University Press, 1977 .
 Eatwell, Roger. 1996. Fascism: A History. New York: Allen Lane.
 Hughes, H. Stuart. 1953. The United States and Italy. Cambridge, MA: Harvard University Press.
 
 Paxton, Robert O. 2004. The Anatomy of Fascism. New York: Alfred A. Knopf, .
 Payne, Stanley G. 1995. A History of Fascism, 1914–45. Madison, Wisc.: University of Wisconsin Press .
 Reich, Wilhelm. 1970. The Mass Psychology of Fascism. New York: Farrar, Straus & Giroux.
 Seldes, George. 1935. Sawdust Caesar: The Untold History of Mussolini and Fascism. New York and London: Harper and Brothers.
 Smith, Denis Mack. "Mussolini, Artist in Propaganda: The Downfall of Fascism" History Today (Apr 1959) 9#4 pp. 223–232.
 Alfred Sohn-Rethel Economy and Class Structure of German Fascism, London, CSE Bks, 1978 .
 Adler, Frank, and Danilo Breschi, eds., Special Issue on Italian Fascism, Telos 133 (Winter 2005).

 Fascist ideology 
 De Felice, Renzo Fascism: An Informal Introduction to Its Theory and Practice: An Interview with Michael Ledeen, New Brunswick, N.J. : Transaction Books, 1976 .
 Fritzsche, Peter. 1990. Rehearsals for Fascism: Populism and Political Mobilization in Weimar Germany. New York: Oxford University Press. .
 Gregor, A. James "Mussolini's Intellectuals: Fascist Social and Political Thought". Princeton, N. J.: Princeton University Press, 2005. .
 Griffin, Roger. 2000. "Revolution from the Right: Fascism," chapter in David Parker (ed.) Revolutions and the Revolutionary Tradition in the West 1560–1991, Routledge, London.
 Laqueur, Walter. 1966. Fascism: Past, Present, Future, New York: Oxford: Oxford University Press, 1997.
 Schapiro, J. Salwyn. 1949. Liberalism and The Challenge of Fascism, Social Forces in England and France (1815–1870). New York: McGraw-Hill.
 Laclau, Ernesto. 1977. Politics and Ideology in Marxist Theory: Capitalism, Fascism, Populism. London: NLB/Atlantic Highlands Humanities Press.
 Sternhell, Zeev with Mario Sznajder and Maia Asheri. [1989] 1994. The Birth of Fascist Ideology, From Cultural Rebellion to Political Revolution., Trans. David Maisei. Princeton, NJ: Princeton University Press.

 International fascism 
 Coogan, Kevin. 1999. Dreamer of the Day: Francis Parker Yockey and the Postwar Fascist International. Brooklyn, N.Y.: Autonomedia.
 Gregor, A. James. 2006. "The Search for Neofascism: The Use and Abuse of Social Science". New York: Cambridge University Press.
 Griffin, Roger. 1991. The Nature of Fascism. New York: St. Martin's Press.
 Paxton, Robert O. 2004. The Anatomy of Fascism. New York: Alfred A. Knopf.
 Weber, Eugen. [1964] 1985. Varieties of Fascism: Doctrines of Revolution in the Twentieth Century, New York: Van Nostrand Reinhold Company, contains chapters on fascist movements in different countries.
 Wallace, Henry. "The Dangers of American Fascism". The New York Times'', Sunday, 9 April 1944.
 Trotsky, Leon. 1944 "Fascism, What it is and how to fight it" Pioneer Publishers (pamphlet).

External links 

 "Fascist Italy and the Jews: Myth versus Reality" , an online lecture by Dr. Iael Nidam-Orvieto of Yad Vashem.
 "Fascism Part I – Understanding Fascism and Anti-Semitism".
 "The Functions of Fascism", a radio lecture by Michael Parenti.
 "The Political and Social Doctrine of Fascism" (1933), authorized translation.
 "Italian Fascism".

 
Authoritarianism
Fascism

Political movements
Politics of Italy
Right-wing populism in Italy
Totalitarianism